The Federal Ministry of Labour, Social Affairs, Health and Consumer Protection is a ministry of the Government of Austria. From January 2020 to January 2021, the ministry was officially called the Federal Ministry of Labour, Family and Youth (Bundesministerium für Arbeit, Familie und Jugend). The current Minister of Labour is Martin Kocher, who has served in the role in the Second Kurz government and the Schallenberg government since January 2020.

References 

Government ministries of Austria
Children, young people and families ministries
Labour ministries
Organisations based in Vienna
Ministries established in 2020
2020 establishments in Austria
Youth in Austria
Family in Austria